"The Crude Oil Blues" is a song written and recorded by American country artist Jerry Reed. It was released in February 1974 as the lead single from the album, A Good Woman's Love. The song reached peaks of number 13 on the U.S. country chart and number 91 on the Billboard Hot 100.

Chart performance

References

1974 singles
Jerry Reed songs
Songs written by Jerry Reed
Song recordings produced by Chet Atkins
RCA Records singles
1974 songs